The Viceroyalty of the Río de la Plata ( or ) meaning "River of the Silver", also called "Viceroyalty of the River Plate" in some scholarly writings, in southern South America, was the last to be organized and also the shortest-lived of the Viceroyalties of the Spanish Empire in the Americas. The name "Provincias del Río de la Plata" was formally adopted in 1810 during the Cortes of Cádiz to designate the Viceroyalty of the Río de la Plata

The Viceroyalty was established in 1776 from several former Viceroyalty of Perú dependencies that mainly extended over the Río de la Plata Basin, roughly the present-day territories of Argentina, Chile, Bolivia, Paraguay and Uruguay, extending inland from the Atlantic Coast. The colony of Spanish Guinea (present-day Equatorial Guinea) also depended administratively on the Viceroyalty of Rio de la Plata. Buenos Aires, located on the western shore of the Río de la Plata estuary flowing into the Atlantic Ocean, opposite the Portuguese outpost of Colonia del Sacramento, was chosen as the capital. Usually considered one of the late Bourbon Reforms, the organization of this viceroyalty was motivated on both commercial grounds (Buenos Aires was by then a major spot for illegal trade), as well as on security concerns brought about by the growing interest of competing foreign powers in the area. The Spanish Crown wanted to protect its territory against Great Britain and the Kingdom of Portugal.

But these Enlightenment reforms proved counterproductive, or perhaps too late, to quell the colonies' demands. The entire history of this Viceroyalty was marked by growing domestic unrest and political instability. Between 1780 and 1782, the Rebellion of Túpac Amaru II inspired a violent Aymara-led revolt across the Upper Peru highlands, demonstrating the great resentment against colonial authorities by both the mestizo and indigenous populations. Twenty-five years later, the Criollos, native-born people of Spanish descent, successfully defended against two successive British attempts to conquer Buenos Aires and Montevideo. This enhanced their sense of autonomy and power at a time when Spanish troops were unable to help.

Although short-lived, retroversion of the sovereignty to the people provided a theoretical basis for the legitimacy of the locally based governments (temporarily in the absence of a legitimate king in Spain). These events proved decisive at the 1810 May Revolution events deposing Viceroy Cisneros at Buenos Aires.

The name "Provincias del Río de la Plata" was formally adopted in 1810 during the Cortes of Cádiz to designate the Viceroyalty  based on popular sovereignty. The revolution in Buenos Aires spread across the Spanish Provincias del Río de la Plata, against the resistance of Paraguay (which declared itself an independent nation in 1811) and the Upper Peru (which remained controlled by royalist troops from Lima, and was eventually re-incorporated into the Viceroyalty of Peru). Meanwhile, the Governor of Montevideo Francisco Javier de Elío, appointed as a new "Viceroy" by the Spanish Government in 1811, declared the Buenos Aires Junta seditious. However, after being defeated at Las Piedras, he retained control only of Colonia del Sacramento and Montevideo. He departed by ship to Spain on 18 November and resigned in January 1812. By 1814, as the revolutionary patriots entered Montevideo, following a two-year-long siege. The Viceroyalty was disestablished in 1825 as Spanish political entity with the fall of Upper Peru with the death of the last Viceroy Pedro Antonio Olañeta.

History

Origin and creation

In 1680, Manuel Lobo, Portuguese governor of Rio de Janeiro, created the Department of Colonia and founded Colónia do Sacramento. The fort was located on the coast of present-day Uruguay and developed as the department's capital. Lobo's chief objective was to secure the Portuguese expansion of Brazil beyond the 1494 Treaty of Tordesillas, which had defined areas of influence in the Americas between the Iberian nations. From 1580 to 1640, Spain had controlled Portugal and thus all of its territories in America. In 1681 José de Garro quickly attacked and seized the new fort for Spain. On 7 May 1681, under the Provisional Treaty of Lisbon, it was ceded to Portugal.

The Viceroyalty of Peru was requiring all commerce to go through the port of Lima, on the Pacific Ocean. This policy failed to develop the potential of Buenos Aires as an Atlantic port, adding months to the transport of goods and commodities in each direction. It resulted in encouraging widespread contraband activities in the eastern region, especially in Asunción, Buenos Aires and Montevideo.

Under these conditions, Viceroy Manuel de Amat y Junyent issued a decree for the former governor of the Río de la Plata, Pedro Antonio de Cevallos, to found the new viceroyalty in August 1776. The ruling was resisted by the elite of Lima, but it was enforced. The cabildo of the Captaincy General of Chile requested from the king to be excluded from the new viceroyalty, which was accepted. The Cuyo region, with its main city Mendoza, was split from the Captaincy General of Chile. Leaders in Santiago resented this action as the Cuyo region had been originally settled by Spanish colonists from Chile.

The Portuguese prime minister, Marquis of Pombal, encouraged the occupation of territory which had already been awarded to the Spanish in the Treaty of Paris (1763), following the British defeat of France in the Seven Years' War. King Charles III quickly reacted to the advantageous conditions: France was bound to be an ally as a guarantor of the treaty, and Great Britain, due to its own colonial problems with revolution in the Thirteen Colonies in North America, maintained neutrality on the issues between Portugal and Spain.

Pedro de Cevallos conquered Colonia del Sacramento and the Santa Catarina islands after a siege of three days, gaining the First Treaty of San Ildefonso. With it, the Portuguese retired from the Río de la Plata and left the Banda Oriental for Spain. In exchange Spain ceded them the area of Rio Grande do Sul, which they developed as Brazil. Cevallos ended his military actions at this point and started working with government, but he was soon replaced by Juan José Vertiz y Salcedo. The viceroyalty was tasked with promoting local production of linen and hemp as export commodity crops, to supply the Spanish cloth industries that the Bourbons sought to favor.

The early viceroyalty

The conditions imposed by Spain on local commerce were high, but Charles III sought to lighten the burden. He allowed commerce through Buenos Aires on Spanish flag ships that were manned with Spanish naval officers. The ports of Buenos Aires and Montevideo were included in a list of Spanish ports allowed to trade with each other, certain Spanish American products were imported tax-free to Spain, and all the cities with ports were to be assigned Consulates or Tribunals of Commerce. This was not free trade, but a predecessor to what would develop.

In the decade of 1778–1788, the commerce between Spain and Spanish America increased by nearly 700%. Buenos Aires was given a customs office in 1778, and Montevideo in 1789. Spanish policy still was directed at restricting Argentina commerce; the Empire banned the export of silver from Buenos Aires and tried to direct exports out of Potosí.

The system of corregimientos to mark the subdivisions of the territory was ended in 1782, and replaced with Intendencias by Charles III. The new system was intended to re-enforce the royal authority and promote centralization. Buenos Aires had the main intendencia, and the other cities provincial ones. In 1778 Cevallos reinstated the Real Audiencia of Buenos Aires, by creating a new one; he maintained the Real Audiencia at Cochabamba. The Consulate of Commerce of Buenos Aires was authorized that year, but legal difficulties prevented its being established until 1794.

In 1766, Spain acquired the French colony on the Falkland Islands, called Port St. Louis; after assuming effective control in 1767, it placed the islands under a governor subordinate to the Buenos Aires colonial administration. The expulsion of the British settlement in 1770 brought the two countries to the brink of war but a peace treaty allowed the British to return from 1771 until 1776, with neither side relinquishing sovereignty.

Decline

By the nineteenth century, Buenos Aires was becoming more self-sufficient, producing about 600,000 head of cattle annually (of which about one quarter was consumed locally). The area was rapidly developing. But wars with Great Britain meant a great setback for the region's economy, as maritime communications were practically paralyzed. The Alto Peru region started to show resistance to continued support of the administration and defense of the Río de la Plata estuary; it provided the main support but its silver production at Potosí was declining. In the first years of the viceroyalty, around 75% of the expenses were covered with revenues from the north. The Alto Plata (mostly present-day Paraguay) also had problems with the Buenos Aires administration, particularly because of its keeping a monopoly on exports.
 
The Napoleonic Wars on the Continent preoccupied the Spanish government and, after its defeat, Napoleon placed his brother Joseph on the Spanish throne. By 1805, Spain had to help France because of their 1795 alliance, and lost its navy to the British in the Battle of Trafalgar. The Spanish prime minister had warned the viceroyalty of the likelihood of a British invasion, saying it could not provide support to the city of Buenos Aires.

On 27 June 1806, a British force of around 1,500 men under Col. William Carr Beresford successfully invaded Buenos Aires. Viceroy Rafael de Sobremonte had escaped to Córdoba. The British forces were thrown back by the criollos in December 1806, a militia force from Montevideo under the leadership of Santiago de Liniers. In February 1807, British reinforcements of about 8,000 men under Gen. Sir Samuel Auchmuty captured Montevideo after a fierce fight. In May Lt. Gen. John Whitelock arrived to take overall command and attacked Buenos Aires on 5 July 1807. After losing more than half his force, who were killed or captured, Whitelock signed a cease-fire and departed for Great Britain.

The criollo bourgeoisie aspirations in the face of lack of support from Spain and the defeat of a world power by local forces added to their confidence and fueled their movement toward independence. As of 1814, Argentina had been self-governed for about four years, and Paraguay had already declared its independence. The viceroyalty was effectively dissolved locally when the rebel troops entered Montevideo after a two-year-long siege. The war remained in Upper Peru until 1825.

Government

The Viceroyalty of the Río de la Plata was created in 1776 by Charles III of Spain. Although it functioned as a Spanish colony, Río de la Plata was technically a personal possession of the King of Spain. This allowed both European Spain and its overseas territories to have their own laws and regulations.

Dependencies
 Intendency of Buenos Aires: cities of Buenos Aires, Corrientes, Santa Fe, Colonia and Carmen de Patagones.
 Government of Montevideo: city of Montevideo.
 Government of Misiones: cities of San Ignacio, Yapeyú and Candelaria.
 Intendency of Paraguay: city of Asunción
 Intendency of Córdoba: cities of Rio Cuarto, Córdoba, La Rioja, San Juan, Mendoza and San Luis
 Intendency of Salta: cities of Catamarca, Santiago del Estero, Tucumán, Salta and Jujuy
 Government of Chiquitos
 Intendency of Potosí: cities of Potosí and Oruro.
 Intendency of La Paz: city of La Paz.
 Intendency of Cochabamba: cities of Cochabamba and Santa Cruz de la Sierra.
 Intendency of Charcas: city of Charcas (modern Sucre).
 Government of Moxos

List of viceroys
The king of Spain appointed viceroys to govern the Spanish viceroyalties in his name. In the beginning their terms had no fixed duration and could last for life. Later he established fixed terms of three to five years. Because of the distances between Spain and South America, and with sailing as the chief means of transport, there were long delays between the designation of a viceroy and the viceroy's effectively taking power. In addition, regular communication between the Crown and the viceroyalty was equally delayed. The viceroyalties had to operate with considerable independence and self-reliance.

See also
 List of governors in the viceroyalty of the Río de la Plata
 Argentine War of Independence
 United Provinces of the Río de la Plata
 History of Argentina
 History of Bolivia
 History of Paraguay
 History of Uruguay  
 Spanish Guinea
 Viceroyalty of Peru
 Viceroyalty of New Granada

References

Bibliography
 
 Lynch, John. Spanish Colonial Administration, 1782–1810: The Intendant System in the Viceroyalty of the Río de la Plata. London, University of London, Athlone Press, 1958.

External links

1776 establishments in the Spanish Empire

1814 disestablishments in Argentina
1814 disestablishments in the Spanish Empire

1770s in Argentina
1780s in Argentina
1790s in Argentina
1800s in Argentina
1810s in Argentina
 Viceroyalty
.

.
Viceroyalty Rio De La Plata
Former political divisions related to Argentina
Former Spanish colonies
Viceroyalty Rio De La Plata
Río de la Plata
Viceroyalty Rio De La Plata
Spanish-speaking countries and territories
States and territories disestablished in 1814
States and territories established in 1776
Titles of nobility in the Americas
Viceroyalty of Peru
 
Rio De La Plata